The men's 5000 metres event at the 2015 European Athletics U23 Championships was held in Tallinn, Estonia, at Kadriorg Stadium on 11 July.

Medalists

Results

Final
11 July

Participation
According to an unofficial count, 16 athletes from 11 countries participated in the event.

References

5000 metres
5000 metres at the European Athletics U23 Championships